The 2007 Colorado Crush season was the fifth season for the franchise. They look to make the playoffs again, as they were 11–5 and division champs in 2006.  They went 8–8 and qualified for the playoffs. After an upset over the Brigade, the Crush lost 76–67 to the San Jose SaberCats in the divisional round.

Schedule

Playoff schedule

Coaching
Mike Dailey started his fourth season as head coach of the Crush.

Personnel moves

Acquired

Departures

2007 roster

Stats

Offense

Quarterback

Running backs

Wide receivers

Touchdowns

Defense

Special teams

Kick return

Kicking

Playoff Stats

Offense

Quarterback

Running backs

Wide receivers

Special teams

Kick return

Kicking

Regular season

Week 1: vs Grand Rapids Rampage

at Pepsi Center, Denver, Colorado

Scoring Summary:

1st Quarter:

2nd Quarter:

3rd Quarter:

4th Quarter:

Week 2: vs Kansas City Brigade

at Pepsi Center, Denver, Colorado

Scoring Summary:

1st Quarter:

2nd Quarter:

3rd Quarter:

4th Quarter:

Week 3: vs Arizona Rattlers

at Pepsi Center, Denver, Colorado

Scoring Summary:

1st Quarter:

2nd Quarter:

3rd Quarter:

4th Quarter:

Week 4: at Philadelphia Soul

at Wachovia Center, Philadelphia, Pennsylvania

Scoring Summary:

1st Quarter:

2nd Quarter:

3rd Quarter:

4th Quarter:

Week 5: vs Nashville Kats

at Pepsi Center, Denver, Colorado

Scoring Summary:

1st Quarter:

2nd Quarter:

3rd Quarter:

4th Quarter:

Week 6: at San Jose SaberCats

at HP Pavilion at San Jose, San Jose, California

Scoring Summary:

1st Quarter:

2nd Quarter:

3rd Quarter:

4th Quarter:

Week 7: at New York Dragons

at Nassau Veterans Memorial Coliseum, Uniondale, New York

Scoring Summary:

1st Quarter:

2nd Quarter:

3rd Quarter:

4th Quarter:

Week 8: vs Las Vegas Gladiators

at Pepsi Center, Denver, Colorado

Scoring Summary:

1st Quarter:

2nd Quarter:

3rd Quarter:

4th Quarter:

Week 9: at Kansas City Brigade

at Kemper Arena, Kansas City, Missouri

Scoring Summary:

1st Quarter:

2nd Quarter:

3rd Quarter:

4th Quarter:

Week 10: at Chicago Rush

at Allstate Arena, Chicago, Illinois

Scoring Summary:

1st Quarter:

2nd Quarter:

3rd Quarter:

4th Quarter:

Week 11: at Nashville Kats

at Nashville Arena, Nashville, Tennessee

Scoring Summary:

1st Quarter:

2nd Quarter:

3rd Quarter:

4th Quarter:

Week 12: vs Columbus Destroyers

at Pepsi Center, Denver, Colorado

Scoring Summary:

1st Quarter:

2nd Quarter:

3rd Quarter:

4th Quarter:

Week 13: at Grand Rapids Rampage

at Van Andel Arena, Grand Rapids, Michigan

Scoring Summary:

1st Quarter:

2nd Quarter:

3rd Quarter:

4th Quarter:

Week 14: at Utah Blaze

at EnergySolutions Arena, Salt Lake City, Utah

Scoring Summary:

1st Quarter:

2nd Quarter:

3rd Quarter:

4th Quarter:

Week 16: vs Chicago Rush

at Pepsi Center, Denver, Colorado

Scoring Summary:

1st Quarter:

2nd Quarter:

3rd Quarter:

4th Quarter:

Week 17: vs Dallas Desperados

at Pepsi Center, Denver, Colorado

Scoring Summary:

1st Quarter:

2nd Quarter:

3rd Quarter:

4th Quarter:

Playoffs

Week 1: vs (3) Kansas City Brigade

Scoring Summary:

1st Quarter:

2nd Quarter:

3rd Quarter:

4th Quarter:

Week 2: vs (1) San Jose SaberCats

Scoring Summary:

1st Quarter:

2nd Quarter:

3rd Quarter:

4th Quarter:

Colorado Crush
Colorado Crush seasons